Scythris terekholensis is a moth of the family Scythrididae. It was described by Bengt Å. Bengtsson in 1997. It is found in Russia (the Tuva Republic).

References

terekholensis
Moths described in 1997